Engenheiro Coelho is a municipality in the east of the State of São Paulo, Brazil. It is part of the Metropolitan Region of Campinas. The population is 21,249 (2020 est.) in an area of 109.94 km². Engenheiro Coelho was founded on May 19, 1991, from a rural community, therefore, it has kept an agricultural economy mainly based on the cultivation of orange, sugarcane, and cassava.

Education
 UNASP (Adventist University of São Paulo), which offers many courses from Elementary School to University.

References

Municipalities in São Paulo (state)
Populated places established in 1991
1991 establishments in Brazil